Midway Arcade Treasures Deluxe Edition is an arcade compilation released exclusively for the Microsoft Windows on February 15, 2006 in North America, and on March 17, 2006 in PAL regions. It is a compilation of Midway Arcade Treasures 2 and Midway Arcade Treasures 3, which had both been previously released on consoles only. Unlike the previous two volumes, it includes the original Mortal Kombat. In the two months after its release, two official patches were released for the collection, one to fix missing music for half of the games that was accidentally left out of the shipped version, and a second one to correct a button function oversight that prevented Random Select and Smoke battle easter eggs in Mortal Kombat II (these were bugs that plagued the console versions of Midway Arcade Treasures 2). A few pieces of additional artwork for Wizard of Wor and Primal Rage were made available as supplements on the Midway website. Like the previous release, the Deluxe Edition's Primal Rage content suffered from emulation issues.

Games 
APB
Arch Rivals
Badlands
Championship Sprint
Cyberball 2072
Gauntlet II
Hard Drivin'
Kozmik Krooz'r
Hydro Thunder
Mortal Kombat
Mortal Kombat II
Mortal Kombat 3
NARC
Offroad Thunder
Pit-Fighter
Primal Rage
Race Drivin'
Rampage World Tour
San Francisco Rush 2049
San Francisco Rush the Rock: Alcatraz Edition
Spy Hunter II
S.T.U.N. Runner
Super Off Road (with Track-Pak)
Timber
Total Carnage
Wacko
Wizard of Wor
Xenophobe
Xybots

Reception
Midway Arcade Treasures Deluxe Edition received mixed to slightly positive reviews with an average score 70.71% on GameRankings. Major criticisms include the installation procedure as not user-friendly (mostly due to the inclusion of the mandatory additional installation of a third party DRM software package for the purpose of copy protection), misleading information about the set being a "Deluxe" set, when in actuality, the Deluxe Edition set is really a repackaged bundle that consists of volumes 2 and 3 of Midway Arcade Treasures in one set, missing audio on most games, for the control setup being a "hassle", "blurry" graphics and emulation issues with Primal Rage.

See also
Mortal Kombat Arcade Kollection

External links
Midway Arcade Treasures: Deluxe Edition media and information archive at Total Mortal Kombat

2006 video games
Midway video game compilations
Video games developed in the United States
Windows games
Windows-only games
Digital Eclipse games
Multiplayer and single-player video games

fr:Midway Arcade Treasures#Midway Arcade Treasures: Deluxe Edition